Simon Fraser Jr (25 August 1886 – 11 May 1919) was an Australian sportsman who was an Olympic rower and played high-level Australian rules football. In football he played with Essendon and University in the Victorian Football League (VFL). As a rower he represented Australia at the 1912 Stockholm Olympics and was a member of the first Australian eight to win the Grand Challenge Cup at the Henley Royal Regatta. In ice hockey he played for the Beavers Ice Hockey Club, one of the four founding teams in the newly founded Victorian Amateur Ice Hockey Association.

Early life and sporting success
Fraser was the eldest son of the pastoralist and politician Sir Simon Fraser (1832–1919) and his second wife Anne ( Collins). His youngest brother Neville's son was Malcolm Fraser, who went on to become prime minister of Australia. He was educated at the Melbourne Grammar School, where he was a successful athlete, cricketer, footballer, and rower, being stroke of the first XIII in 1905 and Captain of Boats. That year he was a member of the school athletic team which won "The Argus" and "The Australasian" Challenge cup. He was also a lieutenant in the school cadet corps. In 1905 and 1906 he played 21 games for Essendon Football Club. 

He entered the University of Melbourne in 1906, where he was a student at Trinity College. He was stroke of the Trinity College eight, as well as of the Melbourne University Boat Club eight, winning a University Blue in 1908 for rowing. Fraser graduated from Melbourne University with a Bachelor of Mining Engineering degree in 1911. Fraser was also an ice-skater and in 1908 he played ice hockey where he was part of the Beavers Ice Hockey Club, one of the 4 founding teams for the newly founded Victorian Amateur Ice Hockey Association. Six  years later he married Phyllis Hammond-Clegg, herself an Australian Ladies Ice Skating champion.

Rowing

Fraser rowed in Melbourne University Boat Club eights which contested the Australian University Championships in 1908 and 1909.
He was selected in the first Australian representative eight which rowed at the Henley Royal Regatta in July 1912 as a Sydney Rowing Club crew progressed through its match races to beat a Leander club eight in the final and win the 1912 Grand Challenge Cup. The two Victorians in the squad – Fraser and Harry Ross-Soden joined the Sydney Rowing Club to enable their Henley entry as a club crew and their families, together with the Victorian Rowing Association had been the principle providers of funds for the tour. That crew with one change then went on to the 1912 Summer Olympics in Stockholm where they competed as an Australasian entrant. With Fraser rowing in the two seat, they were beaten in the quarter-final by a Great British crew – the same Leander eight they had triumphed over at Henley a few weeks earlier.

Personal life
On his return to Australia Fraser managed his father's station called "Nyang" near Moulamein on the New South Wales/Victoria border. He died in 1919 aged 32 from pneumonic influenza at Penshurst, Victoria, after attending the Warrnambool races. 

In 1914 he had married Phyllis Hammond-Clegg who in 1913, aged 21 became Australia's third NISA Ladies Ice Skating Champion. Phyllis survived him, with three young children. She continued to be known as Mrs. Phyllis Fraser for many years after her husband's death.

References

Sources
Holmesby, Russell & Main, Jim (2007). The Encyclopedia of AFL Footballers. 7th ed. Melbourne: Bas Publishing.
Essendon Football Club profile

1886 births
People educated at Melbourne Grammar School
People educated at Trinity College (University of Melbourne)
Australian rules footballers from Melbourne
Australian people of Canadian descent
Australian people of Scottish descent
Essendon Football Club players
University Football Club players
Australian male rowers
Olympic rowers of Australasia
Rowers at the 1912 Summer Olympics
1919 deaths
Deaths from Spanish flu
Deaths from the Spanish flu pandemic in Australia
Infectious disease deaths in Victoria (Australia)
People from St Kilda, Victoria
Rowers from Melbourne